Shaun Gadsby (20 May 1963 – 22 April 2015) was an English rugby player for Cambridge R.U.F.C. Gadsby was an openside flanker.  He also played cricket.  He was born in Wimpole, Cambridgeshire. He was educated at Felsted School.

Gadsby had a successful rugby career for Cambridge representing them 505 times in just over 20 years. He played his 500th game on 29 November 2003 against Diss and retired soon after. He is Cambridge's all-time most capped player, an achievement unlikely to ever be broken.

Gadsby died on 22 April 2015 after a 4-year struggle with leukaemia. The club paid its tributes to him by renaming the bar in his memory.

References

1963 births
2015 deaths
Cambridge R.U.F.C. players
English rugby union players
People educated at Felsted School
People from Wimpole
Rugby union flankers
Rugby union players from Cambridgeshire